The Old Woman Mountains are located south of the town of Essex, California, and north of Danby Dry Lake.

Geography
The mountains receive very little precipitation, with just 4-10 inches of rain falling in a normal year. The Old Woman Statue, a prominent rock formation, is found on the eastern side of the range about two miles (3 km) south of Paramount Spring.

Old Woman Mountains Wilderness Area
The Old Woman Mountains Wilderness Area, with many natural features, protects much of the range for recreation.

Flora and fauna
The lower elevations of the range are dominated by Creosote bush scrub, with juniper-pinyon woodland found in the higher elevations. The dry washes are characterized by catclaw acacia, cheesebush, desert lavender, little-leaf ratany, and desert almond.

Animals found in the mountains include: bighorn sheep, mule deer, bobcats, cougars, coyotes, black-tailed jackrabbits, ground squirrels, kangaroo rats, and several species of lizards.

Numerous raptor species are likely to be found in the area; including prairie falcons, red-tailed hawks, golden eagles, Cooper's hawks, American kestrels, as well as several species of owls. The washes and canyons provide good habitat for several species of songbirds, and the bird densities and diversity is further enhanced by the presence of the known 24 springs and seeps.

History
The mountains were the discovery site of the Old Woman Meteorite, the largest meteorite ever found in the state. The meteorite is now on display at the Desert Information Center in Barstow, California.

References

Adventuring in the California Desert, Lynne Foster, Sierra Club Books, 1987
Part of this article incorporates text from the Bureau of Land Management, which is in the Public domain.
California Road and Recreation Atlas, 2005, pg.107

External links

 
 Wilderness.net: Old Woman Mountains Wilderness Area

Mountain ranges of the Mojave Desert
Protected areas of the Mojave Desert
Mountain ranges of San Bernardino County, California
Bureau of Land Management areas in California